Inwa (or ; also spelled Innwa; formerly known as Ava), located in Mandalay Region, Myanmar, is an ancient imperial capital of successive Burmese kingdoms from the 14th to 19th centuries. Throughout history, it was sacked and rebuilt numerous times. The capital city was finally abandoned after it was destroyed by a series of major earthquakes in March 1839. Though only a few traces of its former grandeur remain today, the former capital is a popular day-trip tourist destination from Mandalay.

Etymology
The name Inwa (အင်းဝ) literally means "mouth of the Lake", reflecting its geographical location at the mouth of lakes in the Kyaukse District. Another theory states that it is derived from Innawa, meaning "nine lakes" in the area. The city's classical name in Pali is Ratanapura (ရတနပုရ; "City of Gems").

The modern standard Burmese pronunciation is Inwa, following the modern orthography. But the local Upper Burmese pronunciation is Awa. The most common Western transcription Ava comes from Awa via Portuguese.

History

Inwa was the capital of Myanmar (Burma) for nearly 360 years, on five separate occasions, from 1365 to 1842. So identified as the seat of power in Burma that Inwa (as the Kingdom of Ava, or the Court of Ava) was the name by which Burma was known to Europeans down to the 19th century.

Foundation
Strategically located on the confluence of Irrawaddy, and Myitnge rivers, and in the main rice-growing Kyaukse District of Upper Burma, the location of Ava had been scouted as a possible capital site as early as 1310 by King Thihathu. Though Thihathu eventually built his new capital at Pinya a few miles east inland in 1313, Thihathu's great-grandson Thado Minbya, who unified the Sagaing and Pinya kingdoms in September 1364, chose the site of Inwa as his new capital.

Inwa was officially founded on 26 February 1365 (6th waxing of Tabaung 726 ME) on a man-made island created by connecting the Irrawaddy on the north and the Myitnge on the east with a canal on the south and the west. The construction of the artificial island also involved filling in the swamplands and lakes (or Ins):†

Shwekyabin In
Zani In
Nyaungzauk In
Wetchi In
Ohnne In
Inma In
Linsan In
Bayme In
Wunbe In

† Other records also include Kyaukmaw In, Ngagyi In and Inbu In.

The brick fortifications of Inwa do not follow the conventions of the earlier rectilinear city plans; Inwa's citadel is probably the only barrel shaped city in the world. Instead, the zigzagged outer walls are popularly thought to outline the figure of a seated lion - the Burmese Chinthe. The inner enclosure or citadel was laid out according to traditional cosmological principles and provided the requisite twelve gates. (The inner city was reconstructed on at least three occasions in 1597, 1763, and 1832.) The design of Inwa, or at least the inner citadel, is designed to replicate the Buddhist universe in miniature. The palace was constructed in the very centre of the citadel, which according to traditional principles of Burmese city design, corresponds to the location of the Buddha, therefore directly associating the King with the Buddha himself. This conferred upon the King a divine status and the palace as a religious centrepiece. The kingdom and its power emanated directly from the city as a mandala, encircling the entirety of the world (in theory) and therefore the city was a cosmological centre of a divinely ordained kingdom.

Ava period (14th to 16th centuries)
The kingdom Thado Minbya founded with the capital at Inwa became known as the Ava Kingdom, the main polity of Upper Burma until 1555. During this period, the city was the center of a flourishing literary scene in which Burmese literature "grew more confident, popular, and stylistically diverse, chiefly through the efforts of monks who chose to write in the vernacular rather than, or in addition to, in Pali." The period also saw the second generation of Burmese law codes (dhammathats), which critiqued earlier compilations, new poetic genres, and the perfection of older verse forms as well as the earliest pan-Burma Burmese language chronicles. The city got a new "exquisite golden palace" in February 1511 by which King Shwenankyawshin is posthumously remembered.

During the reign of Swa Saw Ke, a council was convened at Ava which was attended by the King, members of the Sangha, Sinhalese monks, and Brahmins. In one inscription the city was said to be as pleasant as Tavatimsa, the most important of the Buddhist heavens which also served as the model for the earthly realm of Burmese kingdoms. Swa Saw Ke was known as an intellectual king who encouraged scholarly endeavours and the city was said to be full of intelligent conversation.

During this period, the capital city was the target of the kingdom's rivals. It came under siege in 1401–1402 during the Forty Years' War. Over a century later, on 25 March 1527, the city finally fell to the repeated attacks by the Confederation of Shan States and the Prome Kingdom. It then became the capital of the unruly and often disunited coalition until 22 January 1555 when it was captured by King Bayinnaung. The city's 190-year run as the capital of Upper Burma came to an end.

Toungoo and Konbaung periods (16th to 19th centuries)

The city became the capital of all Burma during Toungoo and Konbaung periods (1599–1613, 1635–1752, 1765–1783, 1821–1842). The city was the base from which kings Nyaungyan and Anaukpetlun restored the kingdom which had temporarily disintegrated in December 1599. In January 1635, King Thalun moved the capital back to Ava from Pegu (Bago). The city was sacked on 21–23 March 1752, and subsequently burned down on 3 January 1753 by the forces of Restored Hanthawaddy Kingdom. King Hsinbyushin began the reconstruction of the city in March 1764, and moved the capital back to a newly rebuilt Ava on 23 July 1765. King Bodawpaya moved the capital to Amarapura in May 1783 but his grandson King Bagyidaw moved it back to Ava in November 1821.

The end

The end of the city came via a natural disaster. Starting on 22 March 1839 (7th waxing of Tagu 1201 ME) the Inwa–Amapura region was hit by a series of earthquakes. The main earthquake hit the region, as far west as Sagaing, the next day, at five o'clock in the morning on 23 March 1839, and many tremors followed for days afterwards. The entire region was left in shambles in their wake. The capital was hardest hit: everything was leveled; many people and livestock perished. The city was not rebuilt. King Tharrawaddy chose instead to rebuild a new palace in Amarapura, and moved the seat of his government there in February 1842.

Contemporary Inwa
The former capital city site is a popular tourist day-trip destination from Mandalay. Tourists can still observe a few remnants of the capital, including Nanmadaw Me Nu Ok Kyaung, the Nanmyin Tower, the inner and outer brick city walls, etc.

Sights of interest

Transport
It is on the way from the Mandalay International Airport to Mandalay. Cars can go up to the Myitnge river. It takes a 3-minute boat ride to cross over to the former capital site. On the Inwa side, a number of horse-drawn carts await the tourist business.

Gallery

Notes

References

External links

Inwa - a short story by Theippan Maung Wa 1931 inc. audio
Exploring old monasteries in ancient capital Inwa 

Township capitals of Myanmar
Populated places in Mandalay Region